Ammonitina comprises a diverse suborder of ammonite cephalopods that lived during the Jurassic and Cretaceous periods of the Mesozoic Era. They are excellent index fossils, and it is often possible to link the rock layer in which they are found to specific geological time periods.

The shells of Ammonitina are typically planospiral; coiled in a plane, symmetrical side to side. Shells vary in form, including those that are evolute, such that all whorls are exposed, and those  that are strongly involute with only the outer whorl showing. They may be strongly ribbed, some bearing nodes and spines; others are entirely smooth. Some have broad rounded venters (the outer rim); in others the venter is sharp and keel-like. Sutures are generally ammonitic, with intricately patterned saddle and lobes. However, in some derived forms the suture becomes simplified, ceratitic, even goniatitic.

The Ammonitina are derived from the Phylloceratina, another ammonitid suborder which has its origin in the Ceratitida of the Triassic. As with the subclass, the closest living relatives of the Ammonitina are the Coleoidea (octopus, squid, and cuttlefish) and not the superficially similar modern Nautilus.

Lower Jurassic superfamlies include the Psiloceratoidea, Eoceroceratoidea, and Hildoceratoidea, which is in part Middle Jurassic. Superfamilies from the Middle and Upper Jurassic include the Stephanoceratoidea, Perisphinctoidea, and Haploceratoidea; the Perisphinctoidea and Haploceratoidea continued well into the Cretaceous.  Exclusively Cretaceous superfamilies include the Desmoceratacea, Hoplitoidea, and the Acanthoceratoidea.

The Eoderoceratoidea of the Lower Jurassic gave rise in the middle of the epoch to the Hilderceratidae, which in turn gave rise early in the Middle Jurassic to the Stephanoceratoidea, Perisphinctoidea, and Haploceratoidea. The Psiloceratoidea from the Lower Jurassic stands alone.

The Cretaceous Desmoceratoidea are derived from the Phylloceratina separately from Jurassic forms and give rise to the Hoplitoidea and to the Acanthoceratoidea.

References

 
Ammonitida suborders
Prehistoric animal suborders
Mollusc suborders
Jurassic first appearances
Late Cretaceous extinctions